Pavona is a genus of colonial stony corals in the family Agariciidae. These corals are found in shallow waters in the Indo-Pacific region.

Characteristics

Corals in this genus have a range of different forms including those that are massive, meandering, columnar, leaf-like, and plate-like. A single species may vary in form according to the current, wave action, lighting conditions, and depth of its location. Members of the genus are distinguished from other corals by having no walls to the corallites, but having clearly delineated septocostae that connect each corallite to its neighbours, giving a flower-like pattern on the surface of the coral. The corallites themselves are shallow depressions with central columella and may be separated by ridges. The polyps, with the exception of  Pavona explanulata, are only extended at night. The foliose and plate-like forms tend to be two-sided.  If they do not get enough nutrients or “food” from photosynthesis they switch to the autotrophic mode, and obtain some of their nutrition from their symbiotic algae. They can also absorb nutrients from uptaking dissolved organics from the water and even using carbon dioxide to turn it in organic carbon sources they can feed on.

Species
The World Register of Marine Species recognises these species:

 Pavona bipartita Nemenzo, 1980
 Pavona cactus (Forskål, 1775)
 Pavona chiriquiensis Glynn, Mate & Stemann, 2001
 Pavona clavus (Dana, 1846)
 Pavona danai Milne Edwards, 1860
 Pavona decussata (Dana, 1846)
 Pavona diffluens (Lamarck, 1816)
 Pavona dilatata Nemenzo & Montecillo, 1985
 Pavona diminuta Veron, 1990
 Pavona divaricata Lamarck, 1816
 Pavona duerdeni Scheer & Pillai, 1974
 Pavona explanulata (Lamarck, 1816)
 Pavona frondifera (Lamarck, 1816)
 Pavona gigantea Verrill, 1869
 Pavona maldivensis (Gardiner, 1905)
 Pavona minor Brüggemann
 Pavona minuta Wells, 1954
 Pavona varians Verrill, 1864
 Pavona venosa (Ehrenberg, 1834)
 Pavona xarifae Scheer & Pillai, 1974

References

Scleractinia genera
Taxa named by Jean-Baptiste Lamarck
Agariciidae